Francis Ntamack is a French rugby union footballer and the brother of Émile Ntamack. He started his career with Stade Toulousain. He has also played for the French national team, earning his only cap on 10 November 2001 against South Africa.

On April 10, 2021, Ntamack was announced as being the new Head Coach of Madagascar's rugby team.

Personal life
Ntamack was born in France to a Cameroonian father, and a French Pied-Noir mother. He is the uncle of French fly half Romain Ntamack.

References

https://sport24.lefigaro.fr/rugby/fil-info/francis-ntamack-nomme-selectionneur-de-madagascar-1040310

External links
 Francis Ntamack on espnscrum

1972 births
Living people
French rugby union players
France international rugby union players
French sportspeople of Cameroonian descent
Rugby union number eights
CA Bordeaux-Bègles Gironde players
CA Périgueux players
Stade Toulousain players
US Colomiers players
US Montauban players
Sportspeople from Lyon